Language & Perspective is the debut studio album by the American alternative rock band Bad Suns. The album was recorded with Eric Palmquist in Los Angeles, California, in 2013 and was released on June 24, 2014 by Vagrant Records.

Critical reception

Jessica Goodman and Ryan Kistobak of The Huffington Post included Language & Perspective on their list of 2014's best releases, calling it "a rare indie release with little excess amongst its singles".

Track listing

Charts

Personnel
Bad Suns
Gavin Bennett – bass
Christo Bowman – composer, guitar, vocals
Ray Libby – guitar
Miles Morris – drums

Additional Personnel
Eric Palmquist - keys, programming, production, recording & mixing
John Greenham - mastering
Michael Garza - assistant engineering
C.M. Rodriguez - assistant engineering
Ozzy Carmona - assistant engineering
Neil Wogensen - assistant engineering

References

2014 debut albums
Bad Suns albums
Vagrant Records albums